Wojciech Łuczak (born 28 July 1989) is a Polish professional footballer who plays as a midfielder for Radunia Stężyca.

Career

Club
In the winter of 2010, he joined Polish club Cracovia on a -year contract. He was released from Cracovia on 1 July 2011.

In July 2011, he signed a contract with Górnik Łęczna.

In January 2018, he moved to ŁKS Łódź.

On 23 September 2020, he joined Stomil Olsztyn on a two-year contract.

References

External links
 

1989 births
People from Zgorzelec
Sportspeople from Lower Silesian Voivodeship
Living people
Polish footballers
Association football midfielders
Willem II (football club) players
MKS Cracovia (football) players
Górnik Łęczna players
Górnik Zabrze players
Zagłębie Sosnowiec players
ŁKS Łódź players
OKS Stomil Olsztyn players
Ekstraklasa players
I liga players
II liga players
Polish expatriate footballers
Expatriate footballers in the Netherlands
Polish expatriate sportspeople in the Netherlands